From 2007 to 2014, Disney released a series of advertisements created by photographer Annie Leibovitz, and featured celebrities in Disney fairy tale scenes to promote Disney Parks' Year of a Million Dreams celebration.

Portraits

References

External links
 ABC News "Fairy tales do come true
 Annie Leibovitz Disney Portraits
 Photo Archive: Latest in the Annie Leibovitz Disney Dream Portrait series capturing celebrities as colorful Disney characters
 Annie Leibovitz's Latest Disney Ad Campaign

The Walt Disney Company
Walt Disney Parks and Resorts